The Best American Mystery Stories 2009, a volume in The Best American Mystery Stories series, was edited by Otto Penzler and by guest editor Jeffery Deaver.<ref>San Francisco Chronicle, Nov. 29, 2009</ref>

Short Stories included

Other distinguished mystery stories of 2008

Other distinguished mystery stories of 2008 honored in the volume were Jacob M. Appel's Ad Valorem (Subtropics), Ron Rash's Into the Gorge (Southern Review), Shelly Nix's Monkey (Hayden's Ferry Review), Leslie Glass's The Herald (Blue Religion) and Becky Hagenston's Midnight, Licorice, Shadow (Crazyhorse'').

References

2009 anthologies
Fiction anthologies
Mystery Stores 2009
Houghton Mifflin books